Ğ (g with breve) is a Latin letter found in the Turkish and Azerbaijani alphabets as well as the Latin alphabets of Zazaki, Laz, Crimean Tatar, Tatar, and Kazakh. It traditionally represented the voiced velar fricative  or the voiced uvular fricative . However, in Turkish, the phoneme has in most cases been reduced to a silent letter, serving as a vowel-lengthener.

Turkish use

Current use 
It always follows a vowel, and can be compared to the blødt g ('soft g') in Danish. The letter serves as a transition between two vowels, since they do not occur consecutively in native Turkish words (in loanwords they may sometimes be separated by a glottal stop, e.g. cemaat or cemaât, which may be pronounced as either  or ).

It generally has no sound of its own, with its effect varying depending on its location in a word and the surrounding vowels:

 in word-final and syllable-final positions it lengthens the preceding vowel, for example: dağ(lar) ("mountain(s)") , sığ ("shallow") ; when following a front vowel (e, i), it may sound  instead: değnek ("cane")  ;
 between identical back vowels (a, ı, u) it is silent: sığınak ("shelter") , uğur ("good luck")  ;
 between identical front vowels (e, i, ü) it is either silent: sevdiğim ("that I love") , or  pronounced : düğün ("wedding") ;
 ığa is always two vowels: sığan ("which fits") ;
 in eği and iğe it is either silent or pronounced  as if written y: değil ("not") , diğer ("other") ; in colloquial speech eği is long i: değil ("not") ;

Historical use 
The letter, and its counterpart in the Ottoman Turkish alphabet, were once pronounced as a consonant, the voiced velar fricative, until very recently in the history of Turkish, but it has undergone a sound change by which the consonant was completely lost and compensatory lengthening of the preceding vowel occurred, hence its function today. The sound change is not yet complete in some Turkish dialects. The previous consonantal nature of the sound is evinced by earlier English loanwords from Turkish, such as yogurt/yoghurt (modern Turkish yoğurt) and agha (modern Turkish ağa), and the corresponding velar fricative found in cognate words in the closely related Azerbaijani language and the Turkish-influenced Crimean Tatar language. The expected process of lenition (weakening and eventual loss of the intervocalic Proto-Turkic consonant *) is thus complete in Turkish and underway in many other Common Turkic languages.

Azerbaijani and Crimean Tatar use
In Azerbaijani and Crimean Tatar,  represents , the voiced velar fricative.

Tatar use 
The Tatar language is mainly written in Cyrillic, but a Latin-based alphabet is also in use. In the Latin alphabet, ğ represents , the voiced uvular fricative.

Kazakh use 

The current Kazakh Latin alphabet proposal, last updated in March 2021 and commissioned by Tokayev, uses ğ to replace the Kazakh Cyrillic Ғ to represent the IPA . The earlier 2020 proposal listed Ǵ instead, but was replaced after public criticism.

Friulian use
The Faggin–Nazzi alphabet for Friulian language uses the caron, owing to its Slavic influence. However, / is often substituted with / due to the former's lack of availability in fonts and input systems. This is because / is in Latin Extended-A alongside / and /, the other caron bearing letters in the alphabet, whereas / is in Latin Extended-B, which is available in fewer fonts and input systems.

Character encoding

See also
 Ǧ (g with caron)
 Ġayn (Arabic)
 Ghayn (Cyrillic)

References

Latin letters with diacritics
Turkish language